The Colombia national under-20 football team represents Colombia in international under-20 football competitions and is overseen by the Colombian Football Federation.

Colombia has qualified for the FIFA U-20 World Cup 11 times, and their standout performance came at the 2003 edition where the team finished in third-place and were rewarded the fair play award. For the 2011 FIFA U-20 World Cup, Colombia qualified automatically as hosts and reached the quarter-finals. Colombia have won the South American Youth Championship three times: 1987, 2005 and 2013. The team also participates in the Toulon Tournament, of which Colombia is a three-time winner: 1999, 2000 and 2011. Also, the team participates in the Central American and Caribbean Games and is a two time winner: 2006 and 2018.

Numerous significant players have represented both the U-20 team and the senior team for Colombia, including René Higuita, Wílmer Cabrera, Óscar Pareja, Wilson Pérez, Óscar Córdoba, Miguel Calero, Jorge Bermúdez, Iván Valenciano, Fredy Guarín, Farid Díaz, Macnelly Torres, Abel Aguilar, Cristián Zapata, Juan Camilo Zúñiga, Hugo Rodallega, Radamel Falcao, David Ospina, Santiago Arias, Luis Muriel, James Rodríguez, Duván Zapata, Jeison Murillo, Juan Fernando Quintero, Miguel Borja, Davinson Sánchez, Rafael Santos Borré, Luis Díaz, Carlos Cuesta, and Luis Sinisterra, amongst others.

Competitive record

FIFA U-20 World Cup record

South American Youth Championship record

Current squad
The following 23 players were called up for the 2023 South American U-20 Championship on 4 January 2023.

Honours
FIFA U-20 World Cup:
 Third place (1): 2003
South American Youth Championship:
 Winners (3): 1987, 2005, 2013
 Runners-up (2): 1988, 2015
 Third place (4): 1964, 1985, 1992, 2023
 Fourth place (2): 2003, 2019
Toulon Tournament:
 Winners (3): 1999, 2000, 2011
 Runners-up (2) 2001, 2013
 Fourth place (1): 2022
Bolivarian Games
Runners-up (1): 1985 Ecuador
 Central American and Caribbean Games
 Winners (2): 2006 Cartagena, 2018 Barranquilla
 Pan American Games
 Fourth Place (1): 2003 Santo Domingo
South American Games
 Third place (2): 1990 Lima, 2018 Cochabamba

See also
 Colombia national football team
 Colombia national futsal team
 Colombia Olympic football team
 Colombia national under-17 football team
 Colombia national under-15 football team

References

External links
 Selección Sub 20 official website
 FIFA Profile

F
South American national under-20 association football teams